Friedrich "Fritz" Walter (31 October 1920 – 17 June 2002) was a German footballer who spent his entire senior career at 1. FC Kaiserslautern. He usually played as an attacking midfielder or inside forward. In his time with the Germany and West Germany national teams, he appeared in 61 games and scored 33 goals, and was the captain of the team that won the 1954 FIFA World Cup.

Life and career

Early club career
Walter was exposed to football early with his parents working at the 1. FC Kaiserslautern club restaurant. By 1928 he had joined the Kaiserslautern youth academy, and he made his first team debut at 17, continuing an association with the club that would be his only professional club.

International pro teams had repeatedly offered him hefty sums, but with support from his wife always declined in order to stay at home, to play for his home town, the national team and "Chef" (German for "boss") Herberger.

International debut
Walter debuted with the Germany national team in 1940 under Sepp Herberger, and scored a hat-trick against Romania.

War
Walter was drafted into the armed forces in 1942, however, the end of the war found 24-year-old Walter in a Prisoner of War camp in Maramures in which he played with Hungarian and Slovakian guards. When the Soviets arrived they generally took all German prisoners back to Gulags in the Soviet Union. One of the Hungarian prison guards had seen Walter playing for Germany, and told them that Fritz was not German but from the Saar Protectorate. Walter would later call the match in question as the most important of his life as it spared him and his brother from a gulag sentence.

Return to Germany
Upon his return in 1945, Walter, who by now suffered from malaria, again played for Kaiserslautern, leading them to German championships in 1951 and 1953. Walter coached VfR Kaiserslautern during the 1948-1949 season and helped them win the 1948-1949 Westpfälzischen Amateurliga. Sepp Herberger recalled Walter to the national team in 1951, and he was named captain.

He was captain of the West German team that won their first World Cup in 1954, beating Hungary. He and his brother, Ottmar Walter, became the first brothers to play in a World Cup winning team.

In 1956, after the crackdown by the Soviets of the Hungarian Uprising, the Hungarian football team were caught away from home, and for two years, Fritz managed their games and provided the financial backing and in small measure, paid them back for having saved him from deportation to the Soviet Union. Walter received his last cap during the semi-final against Sweden in the 1958 World Cup, suffering an injury which ended his international career, and he retired from football in 1959.

Later life and legacy

The home stadium of FC Kaiserslautern was renamed the Fritz-Walter-Stadion in 1985.

Fritz Walter was named an honorary captain of the German football squad in 1958. The other four are Uwe Seeler, Franz Beckenbauer, Lothar Matthäus and Bettina Wiegmann.

Walter died in Enkenbach-Alsenborn on 17 June 2002, aged 81. It was his dream to see the World Cup 2006 in "his" town Kaiserslautern as the town had not been selected in the smaller tournament of 1974, but it was denied with his death. But on the fourth anniversary of his death on 17 June 2006, the United States played Italy in Kaiserslautern and a minute of silence was observed in his memory. Today people may visit the "Fritz Walter Haus" in the town of Enkenbach-Alsenborn approx. 20 km east of Kaiserslautern (first exit from Kaiserslautern on Bundesautobahn 6 direction Mannheim).

In November 2003, to celebrate UEFA's 50th anniversary, the German Football Association selected him as its Golden Player of the past 50 years (from 1954 to 2003).

During the eighties and nineties, there was another successful Bundesliga striker called "Fritz Walter", who mainly played for VfB Stuttgart. Although he had no relationship to the great Kaiserslautern captain, sports fans jokingly called him "Fritz Walter junior".

In 2005, the Fritz Walter Medal, a series of annual awards which were established in his honour, and which are given by the German Football Association to youth footballers in Germany, was first awarded.

Personal life

Walter's wife of five decades was Italia Bortoluzzi Walter, a woman from Belluno, Italy.

It was popular knowledge in Germany that Walter appeared to play better the worse the weather was, and so now the term "Fritz Walter's weather" is used to describe rainy weather conditions, often rendered with odd local dialect grammar "of Fritz, his weather". This is because he, as many other soldiers, had contracted malaria during the war, thus rendering him unable to stand the heat of the sun. The 1954 World Cup final was played in "Fritz Walter's weather" conditions.

On 6 October 1956, Walter scored a spectacular goal in Leipzig in front of 100,000 East Germans during a friendly against Wismut Aue, when he hit the ball back-heel while diving forward.

Career statistics
Source:

Honours

Club
1. FC Kaiserslautern
German football championship: 1950–51, 1952–53

International
Germany
FIFA World Cup: 1954

Individual
 FIFA World Cup Bronze Ball: 1954
 FIFA World Cup All-Star Team: 1954
 FIFA Order of Merit: 1995
 UEFA German Golden Player: 2003
 Member of Germany's Sports Hall of Fame

See also 
 List of men's footballers with 500 or more goals
 List of one-club men

Notes and references
Notes

References

External links

 
Fritz Walter – Obituary – The Independent
UEFA – Germany's Golden Player
DFB Statistics of Fritz Walter

1920 births
2002 deaths
People from Kaiserslautern
People from the Palatinate (region)
Association football midfielders
Association football forwards
UEFA Golden Players
German footballers
Germany international footballers
1. FC Kaiserslautern players
1. FC Kaiserslautern managers
1954 FIFA World Cup players
1958 FIFA World Cup players
FIFA World Cup-winning players
FIFA World Cup-winning captains
German military personnel of World War II
Footballers from Rhineland-Palatinate
Knights Commander of the Order of Merit of the Federal Republic of Germany
German football managers
German prisoners of war in World War II held by the Soviet Union
West German footballers
West German football managers